Jeremy Paul Dwyer  (3 December 1947 – 11 December 2005) was a New Zealand politician. He was deputy leader of the Social Credit Political League between 1977 and 1981, and Mayor of Hastings from 1986 to 2001.

Early life and family
Dwyer was born in Waipawa on 3 December 1947, the son of Sam and Lillian Dwyer, and educated at Central Hawke's Bay College. He studied at Ardmore Teachers' Training College, gaining a Diploma of Teaching in 1969 and TTC in 1971.

In 1983, Dwyer married Marilyn Eva McKay, and the couple had one son.

Teaching career
Dwyer was a teacher and head of department of history and social studies at Te Aute College from 1972 to 1976. He was a member of the board of governors of Te Aute College from 1976 until 1989, including a term as chair of the board between 1979 and 1981.

Political career

Social Credit
Dwyer was an activist in the Social Credit Political League, and was deputy leader of the League from 1977 to 1981.

Hastings
Dwyer served as a Hastings city councillor from 1977 to 1981. In 1986, he was elected as mayor of Hastings City, and then as mayor of Hastings District following the 1989 local government reforms. In 2001, after 15 years as mayor, he chose not to seek re-election.

Honours and awards
In 1990, Dwyer was awarded the New Zealand 1990 Commemoration Medal. In the 1999 New Year Honours, he was appointed a Companion of the Queen's Service Order for public services.

Death
Dwyer died on 11 December 2005 from melanoma, from which he had suffered for over a year.

References

People from Waipawa
1947 births
2005 deaths
New Zealand educators
Mayors of Hastings, New Zealand
Unsuccessful candidates in the 1972 New Zealand general election
Unsuccessful candidates in the 1975 New Zealand general election
Unsuccessful candidates in the 1978 New Zealand general election
Social Credit Party (New Zealand) politicians
Companions of the Queen's Service Order
New Zealand justices of the peace
Deaths from cancer in New Zealand
Deaths from melanoma